Alice Wright (born November 3, 1994, in Worcester, England) is a Great Britain-born long-distance runner.

Early life and prep
Wright represented Worcester AC as a junior athlete. She won the Worcestershire County Championships 3000 meters race in 2011, setting a personal best of 9:39.98 at the distance a few weeks later in Watford.

NCAA
Wright moved to the United States in 2013. In college, Wright was an 11-time NCAA Division I All-American (8 time 1st Team, 3 times 2nd Team) at University of New Mexico.

In 2014, Alice Wright lead the New Mexico Lobos women's cross country team to an NCAA Division I cross country team championship title, placing 3rd.

In 2015, Courtney Frerichs's 5th place (19:48.0) finish led the team to a NCAA Division I cross country team title scoring 49 points. Wright finished in 6th place (19:53.1).

In 2016, Wright led the team to a seventh-place finish in the NCAA Division I cross country Championships.

In 2017, the New Mexico Lobos women's cross country again won the NCAA Division I cross country team title, with individual winner Ednah Kurgat taking 1st place (19:19.5). Wright was the team's fourth runner, finishing 14th (19:49.73). The 2017 team was University of New Mexico's 8th-straight top-10 performance at the NCAA Championships — the longest active streak in NCAA Women's Division I Cross Country Championship history.

Professional
In July 2018, Alice Wright moved to Flagstaff, Arizona to train under coach Ben Rosario at Northern Arizona Elite.

In August 2018, Wright placed 6th (later promoted to 5th) while representing Team GB at the 2018 European Athletics Championships in 10,000 metres.

On September 12, 2021, Wright won the Athens Half Marathon in Athens, Greece, in a time of 1:14:53. In November of the same year, Wright broke the British record in the one-hour run on the track, covering 17,044 meters.

In 2022, Wright made her marathon debut at the Chevron Houston Marathon in Houston, Texas, where she finished second in a time of 2:29:08. She then represented Great Britain internationally for the second time at the senior level, finishing 22nd in the women's marathon at the 2022 European Athletics Championships in a time of 2:35:33.

References

External links
 
 
 NAZ Elite Host Eric Senseman talks with Alice Wright about her transition to joining Northern Arizona Elite, her 8 NCAA National Championship All-American Awards, future in the marathon, represent Great Britain at European and World Cross Country and Track
 NAZ Elite Alice Wright profile
 Power of 10 Alice Wright profile
 Alice Wright profile European Athletic Association

1994 births
Living people
New Mexico Lobos women's track and field athletes
University of New Mexico alumni
Sportspeople from Worcester, England
English female marathon runners
English female long-distance runners
English female cross country runners
British female long-distance runners
British female cross country runners
British female marathon runners
World Athletics Championships athletes for the United States
21st-century American women